The 2015 Asian Airgun Championships were held at Dr. Karni Singh Shooting Range, New Delhi, India between 25 September and 1 October 2015.

Medal summary

Men

Women

Medal table

References 
General
 ISSF Results Overview

Specific

External links 
 Official Results

Asian Shooting Championships
Asian
Shooting
2015 in Indian sport
Shooting competitions in India
September 2015 sports events in India
October 2015 sports events in India